Nasi Beringin is a traditional food, a rice dish, in Johor, Malaysia. It used to be served to Johor royalties in the late 1890s; the sultans would have this fragrant dish especially when guests were invited to dine in the palace.

Usually people eat it with acar, chicken curry, sambal and hard boiled egg. It is suitable to eat during breakfast and lunch.

See also
Nasi dagang
Nasi lemak
Nasi kerabu

References

External links
 Mat Salleh blogger gets first taste of Nasi Beringin (in Malay)  at NST Online
 Nasi Beringin Warisan Tradisi Johor Kini Polular Semula (in Malay)  at KL Media Channel

Malay cuisine
Malaysian rice dishes